C'est Canteloup (originally called Après le 20H, c'est Canteloup) is a French satirical TV show presented by Nicolas Canteloup and Alessandra Sublet (since 2018), preceded by Nikos Aliagas (until 2018).

French satirical television shows
2011 French television series debuts
French comedy television series
2010s French television series